Sherman A. James is an American epidemiologist. He is currently the Susan B. King Professor Emeritus of Public Policy at Duke University's Sanford School of Public Policy, and previously taught at the University of North Carolina-Chapel Hill from 1973–89 and at the University of Michigan as the John P. Kirscht Collegiate Professor of Public Health from 1989-2003. He was elected to the National Academy of Medicine in 2000. According to GoogleScholar, his highest citations are 1151, 839 and 640.

Education
He received his A.B. degree (Psychology and Philosophy) from Talladega College in 1964 and his Ph.D. in Psychology from Washington University in St. Louis in 1973.

Selected publications
Johnson-Lawrence Vicki, Scott Jamie B, James Sherman A. (August 2019). "Education, Perceived Discrimination and Risk for Depression in a Southern Black Cohort." Aging & Mental Health." doi: 10.1080/13607863.2019.1647131.

References

Duke University faculty
American epidemiologists
Washington University in St. Louis alumni
University of North Carolina at Chapel Hill faculty
University of Michigan faculty
Members of the United States National Academy of Sciences
Talladega College alumni
Living people
Year of birth missing (living people)
Members of the National Academy of Medicine